Cogdell may refer to:

People
 Corey Cogdell (born 1986), American trap shooter
 Homer Cogdell (1888–1956), American football player
 James Cogdell (born 1953), American mathematician
 John S. Cogdell, nineteenth century American sculptor, lawyer and public official

Location
 Cogdell, Georgia, United States, a census-designated place